In geometry, the small dodecicosidodecahedron (or small dodekicosidodecahedron) is a nonconvex uniform polyhedron, indexed as U33. It has 44 faces (20 triangles, 12 pentagons, and 12 decagons), 120 edges, and 60 vertices. Its vertex figure is a crossed quadrilateral.

Related polyhedra
It shares its vertex arrangement with the small stellated truncated dodecahedron and the uniform compounds of 6 or 12 pentagrammic prisms. It additionally shares its edge arrangement with the rhombicosidodecahedron (having the triangular and pentagonal faces in common), and with the small rhombidodecahedron (having the decagonal faces in common).

Dual

The dual polyhedron to the small dodecicosidodecahedron is the small dodecacronic hexecontahedron (or small sagittal ditriacontahedron). It is visually identical to the small rhombidodecacron. Its faces are darts. A part of each dart lies inside the solid, hence is invisible in solid models.

Proportions 
Its dihedral angles equal .

References

External links
 
 
 

Uniform polyhedra